Jeonju Made Axis Glory Futsal Club, commonly known as Jeonju MAG FC, is a South Korean professional futsal club based in Jeonju, Jeollabuk-do. The club was founded in December 2009.

Honors
 FK-League
 Champions (4) : 2009–10, 2012–13, 2013–14 , 2014–15
 Runners-up (2) : 2010–11, 2011–12
 FK Cup
 champions (2) : 2013, 2014
 Runners-up (2) : 2010, 2012

References

External links
 Team page 

Futsal clubs in South Korea
Sport in Jeonju
Futsal clubs established in 2009
2009 establishments in South Korea